Neptune Collonges (foaled on 25 April 2001) is a retired AQPS racehorse. He was bred in France as an AQPS (a selle-français warmblood with predominantly thoroughbred parents) and trained in Great Britain. His most noted success came when winning the Grand National on 14 April 2012.

Background
Neptune Collonges was sired by Dom Alco out of the mare Castille Collonges. He is owned by John Hales and was trained by Paul Nicholls. Throughout his time as a racehorse, his usual jockey was Ruby Walsh. At the 2012 Grand National Handicap he was ridden by Irish jockey Daryl Jacob. Neptune Collonges is called Nipper by the Hales.

Racing career
Neptune Collonges started racing as a three-year-old in December 2004 when he was entered into the Prix Raymond de Bouglon, finishing in first place out of 16 runners. His first notable win came in December 2005 when he won the Winter Novices' Hurdle, a Grade 2 National Hunt race held at Sandown Park Racecourse in Esher, Surrey. His first win in a Grade 1 race came in March 2007 when he won the Punchestown Gold Cup at Punchestown Racecourse  near Naas in County Kildare, Ireland. In that race, he bested a field of 10 horses, holding off Kingscliff by 3½ lengths.

Neptune Collonges went on to win two more Grade 1 races in his career. He defended his 2007 win in the Punchestown Gold Cup by following it with another in 2008 when he defeated Snowy Morning by seven lengths. He then flew to Leopardstown to take part in the Lexus Chase at Christmas. He was sent off the 5/4f in a field of 9. However, he fell when leading the field and having every chance at the second last. His other Grade 1 victory was in the 2009 Hennessy Gold Cup at Leopardstown Racecourse in Leopardstown, County Dublin, where he outraced a field of six.

At the 2009 Cheltenham Festival, Neptune Collonges was believed to have been injured while racing in the Cheltenham Gold Cup. The injury was serious enough to put him out for the remainder of the 2008–09 season and the entire 2009–10 season. Owner John Hales said of his prize horse's injury: "We believe it happened in the race, but it didn't show up until a few days after."

At the time of his injury, Neptune Collonges had amassed a career record of 14 wins, two second and three third places while accumulating £685,279 in lifetime earnings. His 14 wins came in 26 races.  He returned to racing in November 2010 and in January 2011 he won the Argento Chase at the Cheltenham Festival trials.

2012 Grand National
He won the 2012 Grand National on 14 April 2012, beating second-place Sunnyhillboy by a nose in the closest-ever finish to the race. He was the first grey to win the National since Nicolaus Silver in 1961, and only the third grey to win the race (in addition to Nicolaus Silver, The Lamb won the race in 1868 and 1871).  He was described as the highest-rated modern Grand National winner, and one of the few winners of the race capable of winning a Cheltenham Gold Cup. His owner announced after the race that Neptune Collonges would be immediately retired, saying: "He'll never race again, that's it."

Retirement
After his retirement from racing in April 2012, Neptune Collonges was retrained for dressage and currently competes for John Hales' daughter. The horse also makes several public appearances each year for charities, including visits to children's hospitals.

References

2001 racehorse births
Non-Thoroughbred racehorses
Racehorses trained in the United Kingdom
Grand National winners
Racehorses bred in France